The 1999 Pontins Professional was the twenty-sixth edition of the professional invitational snooker tournament which took place in May 1999 in Prestatyn, Wales.

The tournament featured eight professional players. The quarter-final matches were contested over the best of 9 frames, the semi-finals best of eleven and the final best of seventeen.

Jimmy White won the event, beating Matthew Stevens 9–5 in the final.

Main draw

Final

Century breaks

134  Jimmy White
102  Matthew Stevens
100  Mark Williams

References

Pontins Professional
Snooker competitions in Wales
Pontins Professional
Pontins Professional
Pontins Professional